Portland Walk is a shopping centre in Barrow-in-Furness, Cumbria, England. Constructed in 1998 on the site of the former Forshaw Street, it was designed as a modern extension to Dalton Road; Barrow's principal shopping district. Barrow Indoor Market is also located adjacent to the southern entrance of the centre. The complex is entirely open-air, however, there has been unsuccessful proposals to cover it with a roof. A 500-space multi-storey car park provides direct access to the centre.

National retailers with a presence in Portland Walk are Boots, Card Factory, Clarks, Clintons Cards, EE, Game, JD Sports and New Look

See also

 List of shopping centres in the United Kingdom
 Hindpool Retail Parks

References

External links

Tourist attractions in Barrow-in-Furness
Shopping centres in Cumbria
Buildings and structures in Barrow-in-Furness